Cyclanorbis is a genus of softshell turtles in the family Trionychidae. The genus is endemic to Africa.

Description
In the genus Cyclanorbis the plastron has cutaneous flaps, under which the hind legs can be concealed.

Species
The genus Cyclanorbis contains the following extant species:
Nubian flapshell turtle – Cyclanorbis elegans 
Senegal flapshell turtle – Cyclanorbis senegalensis 

One extinct species is also known from fossil remains: Cyclanorbis turkanensis , from the Pliocene of Kenya.

Nota bene: A binomial authority in parentheses indicates that the species was originally described in a genus other than Cyclanorbis.

References

Bibliography

Further reading
Gray JE (1854). "Description of a New Genus and some New Species of Tortoises". Proceedings of the Zoological Society of London 1852: 133–135. (Cyclanorbis, new genus, p. 135).

 
Turtle genera
Taxa named by John Edward Gray
Taxonomy articles created by Polbot